Hiram Cleo Carlyle (September 7, 1902 – November 12, 1967) was an outfielder in Major League Baseball who played for the Boston Red Sox during the 1927 season. He was born in Fairburn, Georgia.

After playing the next two seasons with the Toronto Maple Leafs, he was acquired by the Red Sox. His older brother, Roy Carlyle, had played for the Red Sox the previous season. In 95 games with the Red Sox, Carlyle was a .234 hitter (111-for-474) with one home run and 48 RBI, including 53 runs, 20 doubles, eight triples, and seven stolen bases. He was primarily a corner outfielder, playing only 3 games as a center fielder.

In , Carlyle went out west to play for the Hollywood Stars of the Pacific Coast League. He played for the Stars until , when he finished the season with the Newark Bears of the International League. He spent  with the New Orleans Pelicans, and split the 1939 season between the Tulsa Oilers and San Diego Padres before retiring at age 37.

Carlyle died in Los Angeles, at the age of 65.

Sources

Boston Red Sox players
Major League Baseball outfielders
Baseball players from Georgia (U.S. state)
1902 births
1967 deaths
People from Fairburn, Georgia
Sportspeople from Fulton County, Georgia